Cable/DSL gateway is the network gateway which interfaces from digital subscriber line (DSL) and Cable TV to some other physical implementation of the computer network, usually to the wireless network or LAN.

External links
 Review of the cable/DSL gateway to the wireless 802.11g network, manufactured by Belkin 
 Product page of the cable/DSL gateway to the 10/100 Ethernet network, manufactured by 3COM
 Dictionary definition of the cable/DSL gateway

Cable television
Digital subscriber line